Glengary is an unincorporated community situated in Back Creek Valley in Berkeley County, West Virginia, United States. It is located at the intersection of West Virginia Route 45 with County Routes 7 and 22. According to the 2000 census, the Glengary community has a population of 277.

During the January 2016 United States blizzard, Glengary received the largest accumulation of snow (42 inches) of any area affected by the blizzard.

References 

Unincorporated communities in Berkeley County, West Virginia
Unincorporated communities in West Virginia